Fordington is a hamlet in the East Lindsey district of Lincolnshire in England. It is situated within Ulceby with Fordington civil parish.

References
Cox, John Charles. Lincolnshire: Little guides. Methuen, 1924.

Hamlets in Lincolnshire
East Lindsey District